Wilfred James Edwards (12 August 1905 – 1976) was a footballer who played in the Football League for Crewe Alexandra and Lincoln City. He was born in Fenton, England.

Career statistics

References

1905 births
1976 deaths
People from Fenton, Staffordshire
English footballers
Association football outside forwards
Crewe Alexandra F.C. players
Stoke City F.C. players
Stafford Rangers F.C. players
Burton Town F.C. players
Loughborough Corinthians F.C. players
Lincoln City F.C. players
English Football League players